Saratoga High School may refer to:

 Saratoga High School (Arkansas) in Saratoga, Arkansas
 Saratoga High School (California) in Saratoga, California
 Saratoga Springs High School in Saratoga Springs, New York